Zazoo U is an American animated television series that aired on Fox Children's Network block on Saturday mornings from September 8 to December 8, 1990. The show was created by children's author Shane DeRolf.

Ownership of the series passed to Disney in 2001 when Disney acquired Fox Kids Worldwide. The series is not available on Disney+.

Plot
The series follows the antics of a university college populated by different animals.

Voice cast
Michael Horton as Boink
Jerry Houser as Grizzle
Brian Cummings as Bully
Neil Ross as Logan Chomper
Tress MacNeille as Ms. Devine
Susan Silo as Tess
S. Scott Bullock as Slogo Bonito
Stu Rosen as Dr. Russell
Danny Mann as Rarf
Lee Thomas as Seymour 
Dorian Harewood as Buck, Rawld-O

Crew
Stu Rosen - Voice Director

Episodes

References

External links
 

1990s American animated television series
1990s American college television series
1990 American television series debuts
1991 American television series endings
American children's animated adventure television series
Fox Kids
Television series by 20th Century Fox Television 
Television series by Film Roman
Television series by Saban Entertainment